Junior Optimist International (JOI) is an active youth service organization that was created in 1988 and is affiliated with Optimist International, its sponsor. The current Junior Optimist International President is Sophie-Chanel Bourré from Ottawa, Ontario in Canada, with the 2020-2021 JOI theme being "Shooting for the stars of Optimism". There are more than 18,500 members in over 675 communities around the world.

There are two types of JOI clubs that are separated by age groups: Alpha Clubs (6–9 years), Junior Optimist Clubs (10–18), and previously  Octagon Clubs (14-18). Due to the various age groups, each type of JOI club serves their community in different ways. While different approaches are undertaken, the main goal of JOI members is "to promote positive change in their communities."

Like Optimist International, JOI is "a community-based organization with a hierarchy that can take a member from a club to office at zone, district, national and international levels." Typically, each club plans their own fundraisers and service projects. The money raised is then donated to (projects and organizations that will improve the well-being of others, such as the Childhood Cancer Campaign (CCC).

JOI’s motto is "Kids Serving Kids." Since JOI keeps leadership local, it is able to "empower young people to make positive decisions to serve fellow youths and their community."

Overview 
In 1988, Optimist International recognized the rapid growth of Optimist Youth Clubs, which had grown to 30,000 members in 1,000 Junior Optimist and Octagon Clubs, and formed its own international organization - Junior Optimist Octagon International. Since then, JOI members have engaged themselves in youth service activities, such as the Childhood Cancer Campaign (CCC), the Optimist International Junior Golf Championships (OIJGC), and scholarship contests. Through their positive attitudes and unwavering commitment, JOI members continue to play a significant role in the change for the greater good.

During the months of June and July, the JOI Convention takes place and members across the globe gather together. At this convention, members learn how to become great leaders in their Clubs and schools, exchange project ideas, and meet representatives from Clubs all over the world.

2020-2021 JOI Year Ahead 
The theme for 2020-2021 is "Shooting for the Stars of Optimism". The JOI Board is excited to push members to let their Optimism shine! There are some new programs and awards that have been created this year, like the "Star of the month” award. President Sophie-Chanel Bourré and the JOI Board are always available for questions or information.

International Convention 

The JOI International Convention is an annual international gathering of JOI members that takes place at the beginning of July. The International Convention is composed of several activities throughout its four-day span: workshops, business sessions, service projects, and recreational activities. Various workshops take place that teach members how to become great leaders in their communities and are led by guest speakers as well as members from the JOI Board of Directors. While topics range from communication skills to life lessons, all of these workshops allow members to learn more about themselves and motivate them to be the best that they can. The business sessions that take place are where members learn about the current issues within the organization. During specific sessions, accredited delegates representing their clubs vote for any changes within the Policy for Governance of JOI.

Throughout the convention, JOI members are able to campaign in order to become a member of the JOI Board of Directors. During a certain time at the convention, members can "meet and greet the candidates (mingling)" and learn about their positions on certain issues within JOI. Later, candidates give their speeches, participate in a "Meet the Candidates Forum," and then the accredited delegates elect who will become the new JOI Board of Directors. Those elected are announced before the President's Dance on the final night.

Service projects vary from the location of the convention. Sometimes, service projects are on-site, off-site, or there are both. For instance, during the 2008 International Convention, the off-site service project consisted of building and restoring a local park whereas the on-site service project consisted of collecting books for the JOOI of Reading Program. The recreational activities that take place during this convention are the Talent Show, theme days, and The President's Dance.

Junior Optimist International Convention:

Junior Optimist International Board of Directors 

The 2019-2020 Board of Directors: 

The 2018-19 Board of Directors:

The 2017-18 Board of Directors:

The 2015-16  Board of Directors:

The 2014-15 Board of Directors:

Awards:

The Torch
The Torch is the official newsletter of Junior Optimist International. The Torch is published several times each year. The October issue is mailed to Junior Optimist International Club Advisors, e-mailed through Optimist Mail and posted on the website. All other issues are distributed electronically through the website and Optimist Mail.

The Optimist Creed
In 1922, the Optimist Creed was adopted as the official creed of the organization. Written by Christian Larson, the creed was originally published under the title "Promise Yourself" in 1912. Optimists in California found the Optimist spirit well-expressed in the 10-line statement and pushed to have it adopted organization-wide. The wife of Los Angeles Optimist James V. Westervelt saw the item in a newspaper and clipped it for her husband. After publishing it in his club's bulletin, Westervelt and other Los Angeles Optimists encouraged other California clubs to use the creed. Soon after, the creed's popularity grew.

The creed reads as follows:

Promise Yourself:-
To be so strong that nothing can disturb your peace of mind.
To talk health, happiness and prosperity to every person you meet.
To make all your friends feel that there is something in them.
To look at the sunny side of everything and make your optimism come true.
To think only of the best, to work only for the best, and to expect only the best.
To be just as enthusiastic about the success of others as you are about your own.
To forget the mistakes of the past and press on to the greater achievements of the future.
To wear a cheerful countenance at all times and give every living creature you meet a smile.
To give so much time to the improvement of yourself that you have no time to criticize others.
To be too large for worry, too noble for anger, too strong for fear, and too happy to permit the presence of trouble.

See also 
Optimist International

References

External links
Official Junior Optimist Website

Service organizations based in the United States
Organizations established in 1988
Youth organizations based in Missouri